Melilla Airlines (a.k.a. Melilla Airways SL) was a travel agency based in Melilla, Spain. Its HQ was Melilla Airport. In spite of the company's name, Melilla Airlines lacked a valid Air Operator Certificate. It was not a fully certified airline, but operated as a travel agency that re-sold flights from Aeronova.

History
The agency was founded in 2013 and began operations on 29 April 2013, with the inaugural route of Málaga - Melilla.
In February 2015, Aeronova terminated its collaboration with the company due to disputes, which resulted in Melilla Airlines being dissolved.

Destinations
 Spain
 Málaga - Málaga Airport
 Melilla - Melilla Airport

References

External links
 

Transport in Melilla